"A Long Line of Love" is a song written by Paul Overstreet and Thom Schuyler, and recorded by American country music artist Michael Martin Murphey.  It was released in April 1987 as the second single from his album Americana.  The song reached number one on the U.S. and Canadian country charts in August 1987.

Charts

Weekly charts

Year-end charts

References

Works cited
Jurek, Thom. [ Americana], Allmusic.

Michael Martin Murphey songs
Songs written by Paul Overstreet
1987 singles
Songs written by Thom Schuyler
Song recordings produced by Jim Ed Norman
Warner Records singles
1987 songs